Axiocerses bamptoni is a butterfly in the family Lycaenidae. It is found in south-western Malawi. The habitat consists of montane forests.

Adults have been recorded in September and October.

References

Butterflies described in 1996
Axiocerses
Endemic fauna of Malawi
Butterflies of Africa